Marina Tadic can refer to:
Marina Tadić
Eerie Wanda